hit102.5 Mt Isa (ACMA callsign: 4MIC) is an Australian commercial radio station in Queensland. Owned and operated as part of Southern Cross Austereo's Hit Network, it broadcasts a contemporary hit radio format to Mount Isa and Cloncurry, Queensland. First broadcast in 1993, the station was branded as Hot FM until 2016 when it was rebranded to hit102.5 

The Cloncurry translator was installed in 2012

References

External links
hit102.5 Mt Isa website

Radio stations in Queensland
Radio stations established in 1993
Contemporary hit radio stations in Australia